Media during the Turkish War of Independence refers to the political attitudes of newspapers and magazines that were published in Anatolia and Constantinople during the Turkish War of Independence between the Armistice of Mudros (1919) and the Treaty of Lausanne (1923).

Background 
After the World War I, the Ottoman Empire was partitioned by the Entente. The Turkish National Movement in Anatolia culminated in the formation of the Grand National Assembly (GNA) by Mustafa Kemal Atatürk and his colleagues. After the end of the Turkish–Armenian, Franco-Turkish and Greco-Turkish fronts (often referred to as the Eastern Front, the Southern Front, and the Western Front of the war, respectively), the Treaty of Sèvres was abandoned and the Treaties of Kars (October 1921) and Lausanne (July 1923) were signed. The Allies left Anatolia and Eastern Thrace, and the Grand National Assembly of Turkey (which remains Turkey's primary legislative body today) declared the Republic of Turkey on 29 October 1923.

During this period, an important amount of newspapers and magazines published in region supported the Turkish National Movement. Initially, because of the occupation of city, the mass media in Istanbul was unable to write subjects such as Mustafa Kemal Atatürk, Kuva-yi Milliye, War of Independence and Grand National Assembly of Turkey. Some newspapers even openly supported the occupation by trying to convince the people to not resist. There were also many newspapers and magazines owned by minorities who mostly supported a mandate rule over Anatolia and named Kuva-yi Milliye "irresponsible gangs".

List

Media that was in support of the Turkish National Movement

Constantinople

Anatolia

Other

Media that opposed the Turkish National Movement

Constantinople

Anatolia

Minorities

Constantinople

Anatolia

References

Citations

Cited bibliography 

 
 
 
 

Turkish War of Independence
History of mass media
War of Independence